The Papua New Guinea national rugby sevens team competes in the Pacific Games, Commonwealth Games, Challenger Series and the Oceania Sevens. They finished third in 2009 and fourth in 2010, 2015 and 2016 in the Oceania Sevens.

The team has also entered selected World Rugby Sevens Series tournaments as an invited team. The team has been invited to the New Zealand Sevens in 2000, 2001, 2007, 2008, 2010, 2011, 2015, 2017 and 2018, and to the Australian Sevens in 2000, 2009/10, 2010/11, 2011/12, 2017 and 2018. The team has also been invited at the 2000 Fiji Sevens and 2000 Tokyo Sevens . At the 2011 Gold Coast Sevens, PNG defeated Niue and Japan to take 13th place. At the 2018 Hamilton Sevens, the team defeated Russia and France to take 11th place.

Papua New Guinea has also played the Hong Kong Sevens World Series qualifier. In the 2015 edition, they went to the semifinals, where they lost to Russia. In 2016 they lost all matches in the group phase. In 2017 they reached the semifinals.

PNG qualified for the 2010 Commonwealth Games and 2014 Commonwealth Games. Papua New Guinea made its first appearance at the Rugby World Cup Sevens in 2018, following its fifth-place finish at the 2017 Oceania Sevens Championship.

Tournament history

Rugby World Cup Sevens

Commonwealth Games

Oceania Sevens

World Rugby Sevens Challenger Series

Oceania Rugby Sevens Challenger Series

Current squad

Papua New Guinea Sevens squad for the 2022 Oceania Rugby Sevens Challenger in Australia from 19 to 20 November 2022

Maluai PATALA (c)  
Dickson Morrison 
Shaun ONGAPA                                                           
Benjamin BOAS           
Paul TONO
Eliud HOSEA
Derrick VOKU 
Mustapha KURA 
Kunak LATE  
Richard Mautu
Junias Sabatha
Emmanuel Alfred

Non-Travelling Reserves:

Kadum MAIS
Freddy Rova
Kennedy BENJAMIN
Benjamin WAHUNE 
Jacky WINAS

Previous squads

{| class="wikitable collapsible collapsed"
|-
!Squad to 2022 World Rugby Sevens Challenger Series - Men's tour'|-
|
Maluai PATALA 
Dickson Morrison 
Shaun ONGAPA                                                           
Benjamin BOAS           
Paul Peter TONO
Eliud HOSEA (c)  
Derrick VOKU 
Mustapha KURA Goena
Kunak LATE  
Kadum MAIS
Kennedy BENJAMIN
Benjamin WAHUNE 
|}

See also
 Rugby union in Papua New Guinea
 Papua New Guinea women's national rugby sevens team
 Papua New Guinea national rugby union team
 Papua New Guinea women's national rugby union team

References
 McLaren, Bill A Visit to Hong Kong in Starmer-Smith, Nigel & Robertson, Ian (eds) The Whitbread Rugby World '90'' (Lennard Books, 1989)

Rugby union in Papua New Guinea
National rugby sevens teams
Papua New Guinea national rugby union team
Sevens
Rugby sevens competitions